Stephen Conroy (born 1964) is a Scottish figurative painter. He was born in Helensburgh. He studied at the Glasgow School of Art between 1982 and 1987. By 1989, Conroy's work had already gained much recognition and praise in the United Kingdom and internationally. The artist has remained in Scotland, where he currently lives and works.

In 1998, Conroy won the Grand Prize of Rainier III, Prince of Monaco.

Conroy's work is part of a number of public and private collections including The British Council, London, England; The Contemporary Art Society, London, England; Frissiras Museum, Athens, Greece; The Metropolitan Museum of Art, New York, New York; National Portrait Gallery, London, England; Robert Fleming Holdings Ltd., London, England; The Royal College of Surgeons of England; Scottish National Gallery of Modern Art, Edinburgh, Scotland; Scottish National Portrait Gallery, Edinburgh, Scotland; and the Whitworth Art Gallery, Manchester, England.

References

External links
Marlborough Fine Art
Marlborough Gallery
artnet
Artcyclopedia

1964 births
Living people
20th-century Scottish painters
Scottish male painters
21st-century Scottish painters
21st-century Scottish male artists
People from Helensburgh
Alumni of the Glasgow School of Art
Date of birth missing (living people)
Scottish contemporary artists
20th-century Scottish male artists